Das kann ja heiter werden is a 13-part German television series which was produced on ZDF in 1982. It stars Peer Augustinski, Margit Geissler, and Elke Aberle. It was first broadcast on 10 February 1982.

Plot
Peer Augustinski plays the head of a residence for musicians, which is suffering from a shortage of staff. He has to dress up to assume various roles including pageboy, hotel doctor, cook and kitchen apprentice. He is assisted by the remaining permanent members of staff: Senta (Margit Geissler) and Miss Kauzig (Herta Worell). Guest appearances include Horst Jankowski, Paul Kuhn, Günter Noris, Peter Schiff, Hubert Suschka and Elisabeth Volkmann. Each episode leads to entertaining entanglements.

Cast
Peer Augustinski as Peer 
Margit Geissler as Senta 
Elke Aberle as Kathi
Gunther Philipp as director
Kurt Pratsch-Kaufmann as manager
Heidi Kabel as director
Max Grießer as Huber 
Uwe Dallmeier as humorist
Helga Feddersen as Helga
Erich Florin as Chorleiter Siegtaler Musikanten 
Benno Hoffmann as Polizeipräsident 
Die Berliner Hymnentafel as themselves
Die Siegtaler Musikanten as themselves

References

External links
 

1982 German television series debuts
1983 German television series endings
ZDF original programming
German-language television shows